William Jacob may refer to:
William Jacob (MP, died 1851) (c. 1761–1851), English merchant, shipowner, scientist, and MP for Westbury, and for Rye
William Jacob (Canterbury MP) (c. 1623–1692), English physician and politician
William Stephen Jacob (1813–1862), English astronomer in India
William Ungoed Jacob (1910-1990), Anglican priest and author
William Jacob, Irish baker, namesake of the brand Jacob's
William Mungo Jacob, known as Bill Jacob (born 1944), Anglican priest and author

See also

William Jacobs (disambiguation)